Edgemont was an unincorporated community in Riverside County, California, and is now part of the City of Moreno Valley.

Geography
Edgemont is located in Moreno Valley, California in Riverside County, California. The coordinates are 33.510N, −117.14W, the elevation is 1,564 feet, and it is in the Pacific Time Zone (UTC-8, UTC-7 in the summer).

It was originally named Rose Arbor, and it was subdivided for poultry ranches in 1923.

References

Unincorporated communities in Riverside County, California
Unincorporated communities in California